Tim Wendel may refer to:

 Tim Wendel (writer) (born 1956), American writer
 Tim Wendel (footballer) (born 1989), German footballer